Omar Khayyam (also released as The Life, Loves and Adventures of Omar Khayyam and The Loves of Omar Khayyam) is an American film directed by William Dieterle that was filmed in 1956 (mostly on the Paramount lot) and released in 1957. It stars Cornel Wilde as Omar Khayyam, the eponymous Persian poet, Michael Rennie as Hasani Sabah and famous exotica singer Yma Sumac as Karina. It was the final film to be scored by Victor Young, who died before the film's release.

Plot

Cast
Cornel Wilde as Omar Khayyam
Michael Rennie as Hasani Sabah
Debra Paget as Sharain
John Derek as Prince Malik
Raymond Massey as the Shah
Yma Sumac as Karina
Margaret Hayes as Queen Zarada
Joan Taylor as Yaffa
Sebastian Cabot as the Nizam
Perry Lopez as Prince Ahmud
Morris Ankrum as Imam Nowaffak
Abraham Sofaer as Tutush
Edward Platt as Jayhan

See also
 List of American films of 1957

References

External links
 
 
 

1957 films
American biographical films
Works about Omar Khayyam
Films scored by Victor Young
Films directed by William Dieterle
Films set in Iran
Films set in the 11th century
Films shot in California
Paramount Pictures films
1950s English-language films
1950s American films